Stephanie Louise Peacock is a British Labour Party politician and former trade union official. She became the Member of Parliament (MP) for Barnsley East at the 2017 general election. She retained her seat in the 2019 general election, with a smaller majority than in 2017.

Early life and education
Peacock was born in Birmingham. She obtained a degree in History from Queen Mary University of London, and a master's degree from the Institute of Education, University College London.

Early career
After graduating Peacock worked as a teacher, before going on to work on adult education in Yorkshire for the shop workers’ union USDAW.

Between 2007 and 2011, she served as the Youth Representative on the Labour Party National Executive Committee. In 2007 she introduced Gordon Brown at the launch of his unopposed campaign to become Labour Leader.

Between 2013 and 2017, she worked as a Political Officer for the GMB trade union.

Parliamentary career
At the 2015 general election, Peacock unsuccessfully stood as the Labour Party candidate in the marginal seat of Halesowen and Rowley Regis in the West Midlands, where she was defeated by the Conservative incumbent James Morris.

A few weeks before the 2017 general election, she was selected by the National Executive Committee to stand for parliament in the safe Labour seat of Barnsley East when the previous incumbent Michael Dugher retired. She was subsequently elected at the 2017 general election.

Her maiden speech occurred during a Grenfell Tower debate during which she mentioned the local issue of Orgreave.

In Parliament, Peacock has served on the International Trade Committee and the Science and Technology Committee (Commons). From January 2018 until March 2019 she served as an Opposition Whip. She resigned on 14 March 2019 after defying the whip to vote against an amendment calling for a second Brexit referendum.

Peacock has had two key campaigns thus far, changing the maximum sentences for death by dangerous driving from fourteen years to life and reforming the Mineworkers’ Pension Scheme to get more money for retired miners.

In January 2020 Peacock joined Labour's Shadow Cabinet Office team as the Shadow Minister responsible for the Veterans’ Office and Procurement. Following the election of Keir Starmer as the Leader of the Labour Party (UK), she was appointed as the Shadow Minister for Fisheries, Water and Flooding as part of Labour's Shadow Department for Environment, Food and Rural Affairs team.

Peacock endorsed Lisa Nandy in the 2020 Labour Party leadership election.

On 14 May 2021, Peacock was appointed as the Shadow Minister for Veterans following a reshuffle.

Personal life
Peacock lives in Darfield near Barnsley in South Yorkshire.

In 2013 it was reported that Peacock was in a relationship with Tom Watson MP, then Deputy Chair of the National Executive Committee.

In November 2018, Peacock, alongside fellow Women's Parliamentary Football teammates, Alison McGovern, Tracey Crouch, Louise Haigh and Hannah Bardell, was rebuked by the then Speaker of the House of Commons, John Bercow, for having a kickabout in the House of Commons after Parliamentary business. Bercow said that the "historic chamber should not be used for this type of activity". The team had been due to play their first match, but the game was cancelled because they had to be in parliament for a vote.

References

External links

Living people
Labour Party (UK) MPs for English constituencies
UK MPs 2017–2019
21st-century British politicians
21st-century British women politicians
Female members of the Parliament of the United Kingdom for English constituencies
Alumni of Queen Mary University of London
Trade unionists from Birmingham, West Midlands
UK MPs 2019–present
Year of birth missing (living people)
21st-century English women
21st-century English people